is a passenger railway station in the city of Tōon, Ehime Prefecture, Japan. It is on the Yokogawara Line, operated by Iyotetsu.

Lines
During most of the day, trains arrive every fifteen minutes. Trains continue from Matsuyama City Station on the Takahama Line to Takahama Station.

Layout
The station consists of a single island platform connected to the station building by a level crossing. The station is staffed.

Adjacent stations

|-
!colspan=5|Iyotetsu

History
Ushibuchidanchi-mae Station was opened on 1 May 1970.

Surrounding area
Ehime Prefectural Ushibuchi Housing Complex
JGSDF Camp Matsuyama

See also
 List of railway stations in Japan

References

External links

Iyotetsu official station home page

Iyotetsu Yokogawara Line
Railway stations in Ehime Prefecture
Railway stations in Japan opened in 1970
Tōon, Ehime